The Journal of Infectious Diseases is a peer-reviewed biweekly medical journal published by Oxford University Press on behalf of the Infectious Diseases Society of America. It covers research on the pathogenesis, diagnosis, and treatment of infectious diseases, on the microbes that cause them, and on immune system disorders. The editor-in-chief is Martin Hirsch, who succeeded Marvin Turck. The journal was established in 1904 and was a quarterly until 1969 when it became a monthly, then in 2001 it began biweekly publication. From 1904 to 2011, the journal was published by the University of Chicago Press.

Abstracting and indexing
The journal is abstracted and indexed in:

According to the Journal Citation Reports, the journal has a 2020 impact factor of 5.226.

Past editors-in-chief 
For volumes 1 through 186, the editors-in-chief were:
 1904–1936 Ludvig Hektoen & Edwin O. Jordan (Volumes 1–59)
 1937–1940 Ludvig Hektoen & William H. Taliaferro (Volumes 60–67)
 1941–1957 William H. Taliaferro (Volumes 68–100)
 1957–1960 William H. Taliaferro & James W. Moulder (Volumes 101–106)
 1960–1968 James W. Moulder (Volumes 107–118)
 1969–1979 Edward H. Kass (Volumes 119–139)
 1979–1983  (Volumes 140–148)
 1984–1988 Martha Dukes Yow (Volumes 149–158)
 1989–2002 Marvin Turck (Volumes 159–186)

References

Further reading

External links 
 

English-language journals
Biweekly journals
Oxford University Press academic journals
Publications established in 1904
Microbiology journals